The coastal line (sometimes referred to as the coast line or the southern line) is a major railway line in Sri Lanka, running between Colombo Fort and Beliatta, via Galle and Matara. Operated by Sri Lanka Railways, the line includes some of the busiest rail services in the country. The line has been extended to Beliatta on 8 April 2019 and is proposed to be extended to Kataragama, via Hambantota.

Route definition
The Coastal line begins at Maradana Station and runs west towards Colombo Fort.  It then turns south and runs through much of Colombo parallel to the beaches on the city's west coast, passing many commuter rail stations, such as Slave Island.  It passes Panadura before reaching Kalutara.  The commuter rail services end as the line continues south along the coast towards Galle.

Galle station is designed as a terminus station.  Thus trains have to back out of the station to continue towards Matara and Beliatta.  Beliatta is the current terminus of the Coast line, though extension is under construction to Hambantota and Kataragama.

History

Construction and launch

This line was the second railway line in Sri Lanka. Construction works started after Colombo–Kandy–Badulla Main Line. On 1 March 1877 first train up to Panadura was commenced. On 1 February 1878, trains ran up to Kalutara and one year after that on 1 February 1879 Wadduwa Station was declared open. On 22 September 1879 inaugural opening of Kalutara North and Kalutara South Stations and ran first train to Kalutara South. On 31 March 1890 line extended to Kalutara South to Aluthgama. Then up to Kosgoda on 8 September 1892 and Kosgoda to Ambalangoda on 15 November 1893. On 7 May 1894 British government completed the construction works to  Galle . After nearly a year and half later on 17 December 1895 train services to  Matara  commenced.

Twentieth-century growth

In the mid-twentieth century, the coastal line experienced many changes to accommodate growing traffic.  Galle Station was upgraded with better facilities and modern architecture.  Express trains began serving the line, including the now celebrated Ruhunu Kumari.  Along with the rest of the railway network, diesel traction replaced steam locomotives on all services.

Tsunami disaster and aftermath

The railway line was severely affected by the 2004 Indian Ocean tsunami.  A train was swept off the track, killing more than 1500, in the worst rail disaster in history.

Track upgrade

In 2011–2012, the Coastal Line underwent complete reconstruction between Kalutara and Matara, to upgrade the track. The upgrade included replacing the rails and sleepers to ensure smoother and safer operation. The previously 3-hours-and-forty-minute travel time between Colombo and Matara has been reduced to just two hours.

Matara–Kataragama extension 

The railway is being extended from Matara to Kataragama in the Southern Railway project.

Phase 1 extended the railway 26.8 km from Matara to Beliatta at a cost of  million. The China National Machinery Import and Export Corporation broke ground on Phase 1 in 2013. The line includes two bridges of 1.5 km and 1.04 km in length, the longest on Sri Lanka's railway network. There is also a 615 meter long tunnel at Kekanadura. The Matara–Beliatta extension opened to traffic on 8 April 2019, the first new railway built in Sri Lanka since independence from Great Britain in 1948.

Phase 2 will serve the Magampura Mahinda Rajapaksa Port in Hambantota at a cost of  million, and Phase 3 will reach Kataragama. The alignment shifts inland after Beliatta to protect sensitive natural habitats along the coast and minimise damage to property. A feasibility study and an environment impact assessment for the Beliatta to Hambantota and Kataragama phases of construction has been approved by the Cabinet.  Construction has not yet begun as of April 2019.

Operators and service providers
Sri Lanka Railways operates passenger services on the coastal line.

Rajadhani Express operates a premium service on certain Sri Lanka Railways trains on the coastal line, in partnership with Sri Lanka Railways.

Infrastructure
The coastal line has a gauge of  broad gauge.

The coastal line is not electrified.  Regular services run on diesel power.  However, there are plans to electrify the commuter-rail network, within the Colombo metropolitan area.  This includes the coastal-line segment between Colombo Fort and Panadura.

In February 2017 a project to expand the single-track railway to a double-track railway from Kalutara to Paiyagala was launched

Timetable

Downwards

Upwards

References

5 ft 6 in gauge railways in Sri Lanka
1877 establishments in Ceylon
Railway lines in Sri Lanka
Transport in Southern Province, Sri Lanka